The Waterman-Smith Building (formerly known as the Waterman Building, the Southtrust Bank Building, the Wells-Fargo Building, and the Wachovia Building) is a high-rise in the U.S. city of Mobile, Alabama. It was built by the Waterman Steamship Corporation in 1947, and rises  and 18 stories. The Waterman-Smith Building is the 7th-tallest building in Mobile, and is an example of early modern architecture.

Completed in 1947, it was the only high-rise to be constructed in the city from the 1929 completion of the Regions Bank Building to 1965, when the GM Building was completed. It was constructed on the site of the Bienville Hotel, a low-rise seven-story hotel. At the time of construction, the building was referred to as the turning point when the city entered the modern age, and cost $5 million.

The Waterman Steamship Corporation, after becoming the largest privately owned steamship firm in the world, was purchased by McLean Securities Corporation in May 1955.  The building was renamed "The Roberts Building" in honor of former Waterman chairman E.A. Roberts, who remained involved with McLean for decades afterwards.  The Roberts Building sold to Commercial Guaranty Banking Company in 1973.

The structure housed the Waterman Globe, a  diameter sphere created by Rand McNally that depicts the world with the political boundaries of the 1940s. The globe was a local attraction but was removed from the building in 1973 and deconstructed. It was later restored and moved to the University of South Alabama's Mitchell Center in 1999.

In 2017, the building was sold to Waterman-Smith I, LLC for $2.35 million.

See also
List of tallest buildings in Mobile

References

Bank buildings in Alabama
Skyscraper office buildings in Mobile, Alabama
Office buildings completed in 1947
Platt Roberts buildings
1940s architecture in the United States
Modernist architecture in Alabama
1947 establishments in Alabama